Alysha Brilla is a Canadian musician, songwriter, and music producer. Brilla's music career includes performances at WOMAD, Woodford Folk Festival and Montreal Jazz Festival. Her music focuses on themes of connection and healing. Born in Mississauga, Ontario and raised in Brampton, Ontario, she started singing in her early teens in local bands and at festivals. In 2010, she signed a major record deal at Lava Records/Universal Republic. Brilla has since released all of her music independently on her own music label, Sunny Jam Records. Brilla has received three Juno Award nominations for her self-produced albums.

Early life
Brilla was born in Mississauga, Ontario to a European-Canadian mother and an Indo-Tanzanian father of Khoja descent. Growing up in a mixed-race, mixed-religious household fostered dialectical discussions around race, religion, value systems and ideals. Brilla's father played guitar while growing up in Tanzania and her mother was an avid storyteller. Brilla experienced bullying in middle school and she cites music and nature as her coping mechanism.

She dropped out of school and on her 14th birthday, Brilla was given her father's acoustic guitar and she began teaching herself to play. After returning to and eventually graduating high school, she moved to Toronto. During this time, she was recording and producing her own songs and released an eleven-song EP called Got Soul. Her friend Brad Marshall introduced her to Jacksoul keyboardist and producer Ron Lopata and the two began to demo some of Brilla's songs with a band.

Awards and honours
 2017 JUNO Award Nomination for "Rooted", Adult Contemporary Album of the Year
 2016 Winner Midem Artist Accelerator, represented Canada in Cannes, France
 2015 International Songwriting Contest winner in Lyric Category "Immigrant"
 2015 JUNO Award Nomination for "Womyn", Adult Contemporary Album of the Year
 2014 U.K. Songwriting Contest winner in Pop and Singer/Songwriter categories for "Never Gonna Get Me Back" 
 2014 Oktoberfest Woman of The Year winner.
 2014 JUNO Award Nomination for "In My Head", Adult Contemporary Album of the Year

Studio albums

References

External links
 

1988 births
Canadian blues singers
Canadian Ismailis
Canadian people of Gujarati descent
Canadian people of Tanzanian descent
Humber College alumni
Living people
Musicians from Brampton
Musicians from Kitchener, Ontario
Musicians from Mississauga
21st-century Canadian women singers